The Air Force Office was a high command authority of the German Air Force of the Bundeswehr, responsible for the conceptual planning as well as the training, supply, and equipment of the Air Force. In 2013, it was disbanded after its functions were merged into the new Air Force Command (Kommando Luftwaffe), along with those of the other high command bodies of the German Air Force.

In addition to the Air Force Office and Air Force Forces Command, a number of their subordinate units were disbanded, including the Air Force Training Command.

The subordinate elements of the Air Force Office were:

 Surgeon General of the Air Force
 Bundeswehr Air Traffic Services Office
 Air Force Support Group (supporting the Air Force Forces Command and Air Force Office)
 Legal Advisor Center
 Air Force Training Command
 Air Force Officer School
 Air Force Non-Commissioned Officer School
 Air Force Technical School 1 (with Air Force Bands 1 and 2)
 Air Force Technical School 3 (with Air Force Bands 3 and 4)
 Air Force Training Regiment
 Air Force Specialized Schools
 German Air Force Command United States/ Canada
 Air Force Flying Training Center, United States, Holloman AFB
 2nd German Air Force Training Squadron, NAS Pensacola
 3rd German Air Force Training Squadron, Goodyear Airport
 German participation in Euro NATO Joint Jet Pilot Training (ENJJPT), Sheppard AFB
 Air Force Tactical Training Center Air Defense Missiles, Fort Bliss
 Air Force Weapon Systems Command
 Maintenance Regiment 1
 Avionics Center
 Aircraft Technology Center
 Maintenance Regiment 2
 Maintenance Group 21
 Maintenance Group 22
 Maintenance Group 25
 Air Defense Missile Center
 Weapon Systems Support Center

References 

German Air Force
Air force commands of Germany
Military units and formations established in 1956
Military units and formations disestablished in 2013